In theoretical computer science, the modal μ-calculus (Lμ, Lμ, sometimes just μ-calculus, although this can have a more general meaning) is an extension of propositional modal logic (with many modalities) by adding the least fixed point operator μ and the greatest fixed point operator ν, thus a fixed-point logic.

The (propositional, modal) μ-calculus originates with Dana Scott and Jaco de Bakker, and was further developed by Dexter Kozen into the version most used nowadays. It is used to describe properties of labelled transition systems and for verifying these properties. Many temporal logics can be encoded in the μ-calculus, including CTL* and its widely used fragments—linear temporal logic and computational tree logic.

An algebraic view is to see it as an algebra of monotonic functions over a complete lattice, with operators consisting of functional composition plus the least and greatest fixed point operators; from this viewpoint, the modal μ-calculus is over the lattice of a power set algebra. The game semantics of μ-calculus is related to two-player games with perfect information, particularly infinite parity games.

Syntax 
Let P (propositions) and A (actions) be two finite sets of symbols, and let Var be a countably infinite set of variables. The set of formulas of (propositional, modal) μ-calculus is defined as follows:
 each proposition and each variable is a formula;
 if  is a formula, then  is a formula;

(The notions of free and bound variables are as usual, where  is the only binding operator.)

Given the above definitions, we can enrich the syntax with:
  meaning 
  (pronounced either:  diamond  or after  possibly ) meaning   

The first two formulas are the familiar ones from the classical propositional calculus and respectively the minimal multimodal logic K.

The notation  (and its dual) are inspired from the lambda calculus; the intent is to denote the least (and respectively greatest) fixed point of the expression  where the "minimization" (and respectively "maximization") are in the variable , much like in lambda calculus  is a function with formula  in bound variable ;  see the denotational semantics below for details.

Denotational semantics 
Models of (propositional) μ-calculus are given as labelled transition systems  where:

  is a set of states;
 , maps each proposition  to the set of states where the proposition is true.

Given a labelled transition system  and an interpretation  of the variables  of the -calculus, is the function defined by the following rules:

 ;
 ;
 ;
 ;
 ;
 , where  maps  to  while preserving the mappings of  everywhere else.

By duality, the interpretation of the other basic formulas is:

 ;
 ;
 

Less formally, this means that, for a given transition system :

  holds in the set of states ;
  holds in every state where  and  both hold;
  holds in every state where  does not hold.
  holds in a state  if every -transition leading out of  leads to a state where  holds.
  holds in a state  if there exists -transition leading out of  that leads to a state where  holds.

Examples 

  is interpreted as " is true along every a-path". The idea is that " is true along every a-path" can be defined axiomatically as that (weakest) sentence  which implies  and which remains true after processing any a-label. 
  is interpreted as the existence of a path along a-transitions to a state where  holds.
 The property of a state being deadlock-free, meaning no path from that state reaches a dead end, is expressed by the formula

Decision problems
Satisfiability of a modal μ-calculus formula is EXPTIME-complete. Like for linear temporal logic, the model checking, satisfiability and validity problems of linear modal μ-calculus are PSPACE-complete.

See also 
 Finite model theory
 Alternation-free modal μ-calculus

Notes

References
, chapter 7, Model checking for the μ-calculus, pp. 97–108
, chapter 5, Modal μ-calculus, pp. 103–128
 , chapter 6, The μ-calculus over powerset algebras, pp. 141–153 is about the modal μ-calculus
 Yde Venema (2008) Lectures on the Modal μ-calculus;  was presented at The 18th European Summer School in Logic, Language and Information

External links 
 Sophie Pinchinat, Logic, Automata & Games video recording of a lecture at ANU Logic Summer School '09

Modal logic
Model checking